Barbie as Rapunzel is a 2002 computer-animated fairy tale film co-produced by Mainframe Entertainment and Mattel Entertainment, and distributed by Artisan Home Entertainment. 

An adaptation of the 1812 German fairy tale "Rapunzel" by the Brothers Grimm, it is the second in the Barbie film series, with Kelly Sheridan providing the voice of Barbie.

Barbie as Rapunzel was released on VHS and DVD on October 1, 2002, later making a television premiere on Nickelodeon on November 24, 2002. and was subsequently released overseas through Entertainment Rights and Universal Pictures Video. The film was nominated for eight DVD Premiere Awards, winning Best Original Score and Best Animated Character Performance for its main antagonist Gothel.

Plot
The story is told by Barbie to her younger sister, Kelly, who is insecure in her painting abilities.

Rapunzel is a young woman with long, floor-length hair who lives as a servant to the wicked witch Gothel, residing in a magically secluded manor in the woods. She finds companionship in Penelope, a young dragon and Hobie, an anxious rabbit. She spends her time painting pictures of places she dreams of going when she is free one day; Gothel disapproves of this, accusing Rapunzel of being ungrateful to the witch for supposedly saving her from abandonment as a baby.

One day, Rapunzel and her friends inadvertently open a secret passage to the basement where Rapunzel finds a gift from her birth-parents: a silver hairbrush engraved with a message affirming their love for Rapunzel; this leads Rapunzel to question Gothel's story. Through a tunnel, Rapunzel is led to the kingdom outside, where she saves Princess Katrina from a pit trap with the help of her older brother, Prince Stefan. He tells her the trap was set by King Wilhelm, the ruler of an opposing kingdom who has an ongoing feud with Stefan's father, King Frederick. Rapunzel leaves in a rush without learning Stefan's name to avoid Gothel discovering her disappearance. However, Gothel's pet ferret Otto, who had followed her, informs his mistress of Rapunzel meeting a man. When Rapunzel insists she doesn't know who he is, her paintings are destroyed and her room transformed into a high tower with Penelope's father Hugo tasked with ensuring she doesn't leave. As Rapunzel sleeps, the hairbrush magically transforms into a paintbrush.

When Rapunzel attempts to use the brush, a mural of the kingdom magically appears on her wall which acts as a portal. Rapunzel uses it to meet Stefan again, though she insists he never tell her his name for fear of Gothel. Stefan gives her an invitation to the masquerade ball that night. Back at the tower, Rapunzel paints herself a beautiful costume. Unfortunately, Otto swipes Rapunzel's invitation and takes it to his mistress. Gothel cuts off Rapunzel's hair, shatters the paintbrush, and destroys the portal to the kingdom. When Rapunzel once again cannot give Stefan's name, Gothel puts a spell on the tower to never release its lying prisoner.

With the help of her friends, Rapunzel escapes the tower as she never lied about not knowing Stefan's name. At the ball, Stefan is attacked by a disguised Gothel wearing Rapunzel's hair; King Wilhelm also infiltrates the castle and accuses Frederick of kidnapping his daughter many years ago—the source of the feud; Gothel reveals that she was the one who took Wilhelm's daughter, Rapunzel, due to her unrequited love for him, wanting the kingdoms to destroy each other. Rapunzel arrives and Wilhelm recognizes her as his daughter. Rapunzel tricks Gothel into running into her painting of the tower, where she becomes permanently imprisoned for her lies.

Rapunzel is reunited with her biological parents and marries Stefan. The feud ends and the two kingdoms are united. In the end, Kelly feels better and begins painting after Barbie reminds her that creativity is the true magic in art.

Cast
 Kelly Sheridan as Barbie / Rapunzel
 Chantal Strand as Kelly / Princess Katrina
 Anjelica Huston as Gothel, the witch
 Mark Hildreth as Prince Stefan
 Cree Summer as Penelope
 David Kaye as Hugo / General
 Ian James Corlett as Hobie / Palace Guard
 Peter Kelamis as Otto / The Skinny Swordsman
 Christopher Gaze as King Wilhelm
 Russell Roberts as King Fredrick
 Terry Klassen as The Baker / The Fat Swordsman
 Britt McKillip as Melody
 Jocelyne Loewen as Lorena
 Danny McKinnon as Tommy
 Dale Wilson as the Silversmith

Production
Barbie as Rapunzel was the second film produced by Mainframe Entertainment for Mattel, following Barbie in the Nutcracker (2001). Barbie as Rapunzel was produced over a nine-month period. The characters were animated using Softimage V.3.9, with Maya used for special effects. Performances for the 15 human characters were motion-captured over 16 days, and created using Motion Analysis, EVA and Kaydara Filmbox. Motion capture data was also purchased from LocoMotion Studios in Wimberley, Texas for use in animating a CGI horse. The rest of the animal characters were animated using keyframe techniques. Motion capture performer Cailin Stadnyk portrayed Barbie's movements.

Rapunzel's paintings are real art works by Amanda Dunbar digitally inserted into the film. Dunbar agreed to participate in the project because she "like[d] that the movie encourages art as a use of expression."

Music
Barbie as Rapunzel features the original song "Constant as the Stars Above", written by Rob Hudnut and Arnie Roth, and performed by Jessica Brown. The song is heard as a 30-second lullaby in the film and reprised as a 2-and-a-half-minute version during the closing credits, after Samantha Mumba's "Wish Upon a Star". "Rapunzel's Theme" is performed by Becky Taylor. Roth composed the score, which was performed by the London Symphony Orchestra.

The film makes use of Antonín Dvořák's Symphony No. 9, "From The New World" (also known as the New World Symphony), while the music playing when Rapunzel is visiting the village is "Volte", from Michael Praetorius’ Terpsichore.

Release
The DVD and VHS was released on October 1, 2002.

The DVD bonus features include the 26-minute documentary, "The Artist in Me", which profiles artist Amanda Dunbar along with interviews of children commenting on art and what inspires them. The DVD also has two interactive features: dress-up game "Dress-Up Rapunzel", and "Rapunzel's Art Gallery", a visual tour of paintings by famous artists teaching the difference between landscape, portrait and other styles of painting.

The film was distributed overseas by Entertainment Rights, who acquired distribution rights in March 2002 following the immense success of Barbie in the Nutcracker. Universal Pictures Visual Programming acquired worldwide video rights in May 2002, also following on with the success, while ER's home video subsidiary Right Entertainment handled video distribution in the United Kingdom and Ireland through its own separate deal with Universal.

Reception

Commercial reception
Barbie as Rapunzel and associated merchandise sales grossed US$200 million in 2002.

Critical response
Eileen Clarke of Entertainment Weekly rated Barbie as Rapunzel a "B-". Praising the film as "terrific storytelling", Lynne Heffley of the Los Angeles Times wrote, "the artwork is gorgeously rendered and the characters are quirkily brought to life through the multilayered story and voice talent". Grant McIntyre of The Globe and Mail called the film "a delight", writing that it "has all the excitement, idyllic landscapes, gallantry, magic, deceit and romance that have made the [fairy tale] genre a favourite for centuries."

Reviewing the film for the South Florida Sun Sentinel, Scott Hettrick found "The animation is more sophisticated, the colors are far more vibrant, and the feature is filled with more characters, story lines and overall activity" than the previous year's Barbie in the Nutcracker. Hettrick praised the film's characters as engaging, and noted "in addition to Rapunzel, the story incorporates elements of everything from Cinderella, Romeo & Juliet and Dragonheart to Harold and the Purple Crayon".

A reviewer for Parenting called Barbie as Rapunzel "a truly charming update" to the original fairy tale, liking how "This time Rapunzel uses her head-not her hair-to gain her freedom." Los Angeles Daily News critic Chris J. Parker similarly praised the film's message and Barbie's character as a positive role model for young girls, and opined, "The movie is enhanced by its soundtrack, which features music performed by the London Symphony Orchestra. The computer-generated animation is still a bit clumsy, especially in this post-Shrek era. But it's watchable, especially for younger viewers."

K. Lee Benson of The Video Librarian called the film "A contemporary twist on a classic fairytale that will captivate Barbie's worshipful younger fans (though few others)". Rob Lowing of The Sun-Herald rated it 3 out of 5 stars, writing, "The Shrek-ish animation makes everyone resemble a doll, but pre-teens will like a chatty dragon and plenty of magic. The slightly twee result still has personality". Reviewing the film for Common Sense Media, Tracy Moore advised that parents "may want to offer a counter to the traditional fairy tale narrative here, but can still likely appreciate the focus on Rapunzel's good naturedness, her big heart, her emphasis on following her dreams, and her message about believing in yourself."

Awards

References

External links
 
 
 

American direct-to-video films
American children's animated fantasy films
Canadian direct-to-video films
Canadian independent films
Canadian animated fantasy films
2002 direct-to-video films
2002 computer-animated films
Rapunzel
2000s English-language films
2002 fantasy films
2002 films
Films set in the 2000s
Films based on Rapunzel
Films set in Germany
Films set in the 17th century
Films about princesses
Artisan Entertainment films
2000s American animated films
Films about witchcraft
Films about kidnapping
Animated films about dragons
2000s Canadian films